There are around 450 villages in the Virudhunagar district of Tamil Nadu state, south India. They are divided into 11 blocks as below.

Aruppukottai Block

Amanakkunattnam
Koppuchithampatti
Kovilangulam
Kullursandhai
Kurundhamadam
Palavanatham
Ramanujapuram

Kariapatti Block
Kurandi
Mangulam
Varalotti

Narikudi Block
Alagapuri
Alathur
Anaikulam
Iluppaiyur
Isali
Manur
Thimmapuram
Veeracholan
T.Velangudi

Rajapalayam 
Chatrapatti
Dhalavaipuram
Ganapathi Sundara Natchiyar Puram
Kilavikulam
Krishnapuram
Duraisamypuram
Cholapuram
Sundaranachiapuram
Seithur
Watrap
Malli
Meenampatti

Sattur

Kanjampatti
Kumarapuram
Muthalnaickenpatti
Nalli
Nenmeni
Venkatachalapuram

Sivakasi Block
Alamarathupatti
Anaiyur
Chokkampatti
Injar
Erichanatham
Kakkivadanpatti
Lakshminarayanapuram
Mangalam
Maraneri
Pallapatti
Pudukkottai
Sengamalapatti
Sithurajapuram
Thayilpatti
Velliahpuram
Vellur
Vilampatti
Viswanatham.
Zaminsalwarpatti
Naranapuram
Ramasamypuram

Srivilliputhur Block
Chettikulam
Keelarajakularaman
Mallipudur
P.Ramachandrapuram
Saminathapuram
Thiruvannamalai
Akkanapuram

Tiruchuli Block
Kalloorani
Kulasekaranallur
Kullampatti
Pallimadam
Poolangal
Keelakurunaikulam

Vembakottai Block
Alangulam
Appayanaickenpatti
Elayirampannai
Ettakkapatti
Kakkivadanpatti
Kanjampatti
Mamsapuram
Melanmarainadu
Sankarapandiapuram
Subramaniapuram
Thayilpatti
Valayapatti
[Pulipparaipatti]

Virudhunagar Block
Alagapuri
Appayanaickenpatti
Kooraikundu
Meesalur
Pavali
Pudupatti
Rosalpatti
Sankaralingapuram
Senkottai
Valayapatti
Valliyur

Watrap Block
Akkanapuram
Ayan Nathampatti
Kansapuram
Kottaiyur 
Kunnur
Maharajapuram
Sundarapandiam
Valayapatti

References

Virudhunagar district
Villages in Virudhunagar district